Eucalyptus cooperiana, commonly known as the many-flowered mallee, is a species of mallee that is endemic to an area along the south coast of Western Australia. It is described as being "of striking appearance by reason of its smooth, white bark and acutely angled branchlets". It has lance-shaped adult leaves, flower buds in groups of between nine and thirteen or more, creamy yellow flowers and urn-shaped fruit.

Description
The bark is smooth, powdery and white over pale grey to pinkish over most of the tree with some rough grey fibrous bark at the base. Charles Gardner described the species as being "of striking appearance by reason of its smooth, white bark and acutely angled branchlets". Flowering occurs between October and December or between January and March and the flowers are creamy yellow.

Taxonomy and naming
Eucalyptus cooperiana was first formally described by the botanist Ferdinand von Mueller in 1880 as part of the work Fragmenta Phytographiae Australiae. The type specimen was collected by George Maxwell. The specific epithet (cooperiana) honours Ellwood Cooper, a Californian horticulturalist, who introduced many species of Eucalyptus to the United States and wrote Forest Culture and Eucalyptus trees.

Distribution and habitat
The many-flowered mallee is found on sand plains along south coast of Western Australia between Esperance and Israelite Bayin the Goldfields-Esperance region where it grows in sandy-clay soils over limestone.

Conservation status
This eucalypt is classified as "not threatened" by the Government of Western Australia Department of Parks and Wildlife.

See also
List of Eucalyptus species

References

cooperiana
Endemic flora of Western Australia
Mallees (habit)
Myrtales of Australia
Eucalypts of Western Australia
Plants described in 1880
Taxa named by Ferdinand von Mueller